East Timor-Israel relations refers to diplomatic ties between East Timor and Israel.

History
East Timor established diplomatic relations with the State of Israel in August 2002. Israel is represented in East Timor through its embassy in Singapore.

President of East Timor, José Ramos-Horta, visited Israel in 2011. He also delivered a lecture to students at the Hebrew University of Jerusalem. While in Israel, Horta met with Israeli president Shimon Peres.  East Timor is particularly interested in strategic cooperation with Israel in the spheres of agriculture and naval security.

Sagi Karni is Israel's non resident ambassador to East Timor based in Singapore.

See also
List of ambassadors of Israel to East Timor

References 

Bilateral relations of Israel
Israel